NGC 5575 (also: NGC 5578) is a lenticular galaxy in the constellation Virgo. The object was discovered on May 8, 1864 by the German astronomer Albert Marth.

See also
 List of NGC objects

References 

5575
9184
+01-37-008
051272
Lenticular galaxies
Discoveries by Albert Marth
Astronomical objects discovered in 1864
Virgo (constellation)